Jalil Lespert (born 11 May 1976) is a French actor, screenwriter and director.

Life and career
Born to an ethnic French (Pied-Noir) father, actor Jean Lespert, and an Algerian mother, who is an attorney and a jurist, Lespert first studied law, to please his mother. But he was more interested in acting.

He married Sonia Rolland, a former Miss France, with whom he has one child named Kahina. He also has two other children, Jena and Aliosha, from a previous relationship.

Lespert made his film debut in 1995, in Laurent Cantet's film Jeux de plage, opposite his father. His first major role came in 1999, in Jacques Maillot's film Nos vies heureuses. The following year, he appeared in another Cantet film, Ressources humaines, which earned him a César Award for Most Promising Actor in 2001.

His career took off and he appeared in several films, playing a wide range of characters, such as a sensual gardener in Sade, a body builder addict in Vivre me tue, a boxer in Virgil, an avant-garde artist in Alain Resnais's Pas sur la bouche, a journalist in Robert Guédiguian's Le Promeneur du Champ de Mars, etc.

He is appearing in a series on French television called Pigalle, la nuit.

Lespert directed his first film in 2007, 24 mesures, featuring Benoît Magimel and Sami Bouajila. His second feature as director, Des vents contraires (2011), featured Magimel alongside Audrey Tautou and Isabelle Carré.

Selected filmography

As actor
 1997 - Les Sanguinaires, directed by Laurent Cantet
 1999 - Human Resources, directed by Laurent Cantet
 2001 - Inch'Allah Dimanche, directed by Yamina Benguigui
 2001 - Bella Ciao, directed by Stéphane Giusti
 2003 - Les Amateurs, directed by Martin Valente
 2003 - Not on the Lips
 2004 - L'ennemi naturel, directed by Pierre Erwan Guillaume
 2005 - The Young Lieutenant, directed by Xavier Beauvois
 2006 - Le Voyage en Arménie, directed by Robert Guédiguian
 2008 - Tell No One, directed by Guillaume Canet
 2008 - Ligne de Front, directed by Jean-Christophe Klotz
 2014 - De guerre lasse, directed by Olivier Panchot

As director/writer
 2007 - 24 Bars (24 mesures) - Director and writer
 2011 - Headwinds (Des vents contraires) - Director and writer
 2014 - Yves Saint Laurent - Director and writer
 2016 - Iris - Director, writer and actor

External links 

 

French male stage actors
French male screenwriters
French screenwriters
French film directors
Living people
1976 births
Male actors from Paris
French people of Algerian descent
Most Promising Actor César Award winners
Most Promising Actor Lumières Award winners
French male television actors